Barrandeites is an extinct genus of cephalopods belonging to the Ammonite subclass.
It takes its name in honour of the paleontologist Joachim Barrande.

References 

Ammonite genera